The 1973–74 season of the Moroccan Throne Cup was the 18th edition of the competition.

Raja Club Athletic won the cup, beating Maghreb de Fès 1–0 in the final, played at the Stade d'honneur in Casablanca. Raja Club Athletic won the tournament for the first time in their history.

Raja Club Athletic also won the first title in their history.

Competition

Last 16

Quarter-finals

Semi-finals

Final 
The final took place between the two winning semi-finalists, Raja Club Athletic and Maghreb de Fès, on 28 July 1974 at the Stade d'honneur in Casablanca.

Notes and references 

1973
1973 in association football
1974 in association football
1973–74 in Moroccan football